The 1939 Rutgers Queensmen football team represented Rutgers University in the 1939 college football season. In their second season under head coach Harvey Harman, the Queensmen compiled a 7–1–1 record, won the Middle Three Conference championship, and outscored their opponents 146 to 70. Rutgers was undefeated in its first eight games, but fell short of its first undefeated season in 70 years when Brown scored 13 points in the fourth quarter to defeat the Queensmen, 13–0, in a Thanksgiving Day game at Providence, Rhode Island.

Schedule

References

Rutgers
Rutgers Scarlet Knights football seasons
Rutgers Queensmen football